Ramularia spinaciae is a fungal plant pathogen infecting spinach.

References

External links

Fungal plant pathogens and diseases
Leaf vegetable diseases
spinaciae